Martha Angélica Bernardino Rojas (born 2 August 1973) is a Mexican politician from the Party of the Democratic Revolution. She served as Deputy of the LVIII and LXI Legislatures of the Mexican Congress representing the State of Mexico, as well as a local deputy in the Congress of the State of Mexico.

References

1973 births
Living people
Politicians from Mexico City
Women members of the Chamber of Deputies (Mexico)
Party of the Democratic Revolution politicians
21st-century Mexican politicians
21st-century Mexican women politicians
Members of the Congress of the State of Mexico
Deputies of the LXI Legislature of Mexico
Members of the Chamber of Deputies (Mexico) for the State of Mexico